Dargahqoli (also Romanized as Dargāhqolī) is a village in Qaleh Darrehsi Rural District, in the Central District of Maku County, West Azerbaijan Province, Iran. At the 2006 census, its population was 45, in 9 families.

References 

Populated places in Maku County